Blue Norther may refer to:

 Blue Norther (weather)
 Blue Norther (horse)
 Blue Norther Stakes annual horse race